NOMAD was founded in 2002 as an independent formation and registered as association in 2006. It targets to produce and experiment new patterns in the digital art sphere by using various lenses of other disciplines. The core of the formation consists of designers, engineers, architects, curators and writers. The infrastructure is based on technical and theoretical levels to provide collaborations with affiliations of artists. NOMAD's production network aims to build strong connections across territorial borders through digital culture oriented projects. The main goal of these projects is to establish a productive communication channel that enables access to new resources of information. The core development team consists of Basak Senova, Emre Erkal, Erhan Muratoglu.

Project ctrl_alt_del was the first sound art festival realized in Turkey, in September 2003. It was a collaboration between NOMAD, Marres, Hedah, and Istanbul Technical University Center for Advanced Musical Studies (MIAM). All through the month of September 2003, several events were realized in two cities, Istanbul and Maastricht: (i) an introductory presentation, a CD launch, performances by two artists from the Netherlands and Turkey in Marres (Maastricht); (ii) a panel and workshop series at Istanbul Technical University, Faculty of Architecture and MIAM; (iii) a series of performances in Babylon, Istanbul during the opening of the 8th International Istanbul Biennial; (iv) a panel, and performance series at Marres; (v) an exhibition at Marres; (vi) an audio CD which was distributed in Europe through Lowlands, and the international distribution of  the CD-ROM was carried out by NOMAD. ctrl_alt_del aimed at introducing Turkey to sound-art via sound-art's pioneering names, together with panels and workshops. More than 30 people from 16 different countries contributed to the project in 2003.

In 2005, ctrl_alt_del took place in the “positionings” section of the 9th International Istanbul Biennial. The project launched on September 16, 2005 with an opening night performance at Balans Music hall, then continued on the Bosphorus, the Golden Horn, Istanbul Technical University's MIAM studios, laboratories, library and concert hall till September 22. The 2005 programme for the ctrl_alt_del project has been developed by Basak Senova, Emre Erkal, Erhan Muratoglu, Pieter Snapper, and Paul Devens. Can Karadogan was responsible for the logistics of ITU activities as the project coordinator and Nusin Odelli was in charge of editing of the printed material. 57 people from 12 countries participated in the project.

In 2007, ctrl_alt_del will be realized by NOMAD in cooperation with Istanbul Technical University – MIAM. This year, ctrl_alt_del will include Opening Concert, Performance Series (live), Workshops, Panels, Presentations, Open Call, Field Studies/Workshops, Exhibition, Radio Programmes, Publication and CD release. The theme of ctrl_alt_del 2007 will be “remote orienteering”. The theme is not only connected to the navigational systems but it is also about positioning oneself within interconnected social and political realities. The theme will also be processed with the issues of control. It will take place parallel to the 10th International Istanbul Biennial in September. The development team consist of Paul Devens (NL), Can Karadogan (TR), Basak Senova (TR), Eran Sachs (DE/IL), Erhan Muratoglu (TR), and Emre Erkal (TR).

External links
 http://project-ctrl-alt-del.com
 http://www.nomad-tv.net

International cultural organizations
Arts in Turkey